Tula Municipality is one of the municipalities of Tamaulipas, Mexico. The seat is at Ciudad Tula.

Municipalities of Tamaulipas